Eliane Perreira da Silva (born 22 April 1971), commonly known simply as Eliane or Lia, is a Brazilian women's international footballer who plays as a goalkeeper. She is a member of the Brazil women's national football team. She was part of the team at the 1995 FIFA Women's World Cup.

References

External links
 

1971 births
Living people
Brazilian women's footballers
Brazil women's international footballers
Place of birth missing (living people)
1995 FIFA Women's World Cup players
Women's association football goalkeepers